Ardelan may refer to:

Mark Ardelan (born 1983), Canadian ice hockey player
Ardalan, Qazvin, village in Iran